Supreme Majesty is a power metal band from Sweden.

Discography
Divine Enigma (M-CD) (1999)
Tales of a tragic kingdom (2001)
Danger (2003)
Elements of Creation (2005)

External links
Official website

Swedish power metal musical groups